Babumon is a 1975 Indian Malayalam-language film, directed by Hariharan and written by G. P. Balan. The film stars Prem Nazir, Jayabharathi, Srividya and Adoor Bhasi. It is a remake of the Hindi film Door Gagan Ki Chhaon Mein.

Plot

Cast 

 Prem Nazir as Unnikrishnan
 Jayabharathi as Indumathi
 Srividya as Sharada
 Master Raghu as Babumon
 Adoor Bhasi as Balu
 K. P. Ummer
 Thikkurissy Sukumaran Nair
 Jose Prakash as Puli Naanu
 T. S. Muthaiah as Ashaan
 Pattom Sadan
 Sankaradi as Pathiru Menon
 Bahadoor as Panikkar
 Sreelatha Namboothiri as Vasanthi
 Sunil
 Prathapachandran
 Azhikkode Balan
 Benny the dog
 Madamana Subramanyam
Muthukulam Raghavan Pillai as An Advocate
 Vellur P. Chandrasekharan
 Vinayaraj
Santo Krishnan

Soundtrack 
The music was composed by M. S. Viswanathan. Lyrics for all the songs were penned by Mankombu Gopalakrishnan.

References

External links 
 

1970s Malayalam-language films
1975 drama films
1975 films
Films directed by Hariharan
Films scored by M. S. Viswanathan
Indian drama films
Malayalam remakes of Hindi films